John Christian Bailar III (October 9, 1932 – September 6, 2016) was an American statistician and Professor Emeritus at the University of Chicago. He died at the age of 83 in Mitchellville, Maryland on September 6, 2016.

He was born in Urbana, Illinois, the son of John C. Bailar, Jr., a chemistry professor.
He graduated from the University of Colorado with a B.A. in chemistry in 1953, from Yale University with an M.D. in 1955, and from American University with a Ph.D. in statistics in 1973. At American University he met his wife, fellow statistician Barbara A. Bailar.

He was editor-in-chief of the Journal of the National Cancer Institute and has been on the Editorial Board of Cancer Research and statistical consultant to the New England Journal of Medicine.  He also was briefly a Professor of Biostatistics at the Harvard School of Public Health in Boston before he moved to Canada. In 1975 he was elected as a Fellow of the American Statistical Association.

Memberships/Awards

 Fellow of the American Statistical Association (1975)
 Elected member of the National Academy of Medicine (1993)
 Elected member of the International Statistical Institute
 Fellow of the American College of Epidemiology
 Fellow of the American Association for the Advancement of Science
 Fellow of the Collegium Ramazzini (1996)
 Fellow of the MacArthur Fellows Program (1990-1995)

Works

Medical uses of statistics, Editors John Christian Bailar, Frederick Mosteller, CRC Press, 1992, 
Assessment of the NIOSH head-and-face anthropometric survey of U.S. respirator users, Editors John Christian Bailar, Emily Ann Meyer, Robert Pool, National Academies Press, 2007,

References

Further reading

External links
 

1932 births
2016 deaths
American statisticians
People from Urbana, Illinois
University of Colorado alumni
Yale School of Medicine alumni
American University alumni
University of Chicago faculty
MacArthur Fellows
Elected Members of the International Statistical Institute
Medical journal editors
Fellows of the American Statistical Association
Mathematicians from Illinois
Fellows of the American College of Epidemiology
20th-century American mathematicians
Members of the National Academy of Medicine